Elizabeth Gomez, known as Elizabeth Le Fey also known by the stage name Globelamp is an American singer-songwriter, musician, and producer from California, United States.

Career
Le Fey, who was born Elizabeth Gomez, started writing poetry at age 15, inspired by books like the Harry Potter series and old mythological legends. She would start putting music to those poems years later, once she learned to play the guitar. Her earliest music influences include Syd Barrett but as a young teen, she was inspired by the works of Conor Oberst which led her to  performing on her acoustic guitar at small coffee shops in Orange County, California. At age 15 she saw Le Tigre perform in Los Angeles, which made her love feminist rock.

In her early twenties, she moved to Olympia, Washington, to study at Evergreen State College. Shortly thereafter, she became an intern at K Records and formed the psych-punk band Meowtain. Elizabeth le Fey released her self-titled EP Globelamp, in 2011. She then took off to write, produce, and record her debut full length Star Dust, but prior to release, she began touring with the psych-rock band Foxygen in September 2012 after being asked to star in their music video "San Francisco"

Star Dust

Star Dust began as a lo-fi 8 track cassette recording experiment, recorded in many different houses across the United States. Le Fey first released Star Dust as an EP before re-releasing it as a full length, a year later on June 3, 2014 through Gazelle Recordings, holding six additional tracks.

Accompanying the release of Star Dust, Le Fey released a music video for the song "Breathing Ritual", June 2014.

Covers albums

In November 2014, le Fey produced and self released a covers album. A follow up was released in 2018.

The Orange Glow

In May 2015 she opened for Laura Jane Grace in New York City at City Winery, and in Los Angeles at Hollywood Forever's Masonic Lodge.

In October, she released the freak-folk album The Orange Glow on cassette through Psychedelic Thriftstore Recordings, before being signed to Wichita Recordings and re-releasing it June 10, 2016.

Before the re-release of The Orange Glow, she premiered her music video for the opening track "Washington Moon" on February 18 of 2016. Followed by videos for her singles "Controversial/Confrontational" and "San Francisco" in April. "San Francisco" shares a name with a Foxygen song. The video was filmed at the Madonna Inn, which was the same location Foxygen's "San Francisco" was filmed, in which she appeared in during the summer of 2013. A few days before the release of the album, Le Fey put out the music video for her song "Artist/Traveler".

November 14, 2016 she premiered her music video for the album's title track "The Orange Glow".

Romantic Cancer

On October 12, 2018 she released her third album Romantic Cancer through Nefarious Industries. It features guest accordion by James Felice of The Felice Brothers and guest vocals and trombone by Morgan Y. Evans (Walking Bombs). It was recorded at Bohemesphere Studios, in the Catskill Mountains.

Musical influences 
Globelamp said that Conor Oberst inspired her to start writing songs, and that as a songwriter she is inspired by Elliott Smith, Fiona Apple, Syd Barrett, Taylor Swift, Tori Amos and Nick Drake.

Discography

Albums

Extended plays

Music videos

References

External links
 Globelamp's Discogs
 Meowtain's Discogs

Wichita Recordings artists
Indie folk musicians
Psychedelic folk musicians
American folk musicians
American women singer-songwriters
Living people
American feminists
American folk guitarists
Year of birth missing (living people)
21st-century American women
Singer-songwriters from California